Al Kuan is a Malaysian music producer, recording engineer, songwriter, copyright manager, A&R, columnist, and artists agent.

Early life 
The book collection of Kuan's father made Kuan a bookworm since a young age. In elementary school, he read classic literature such as Reader's Digest, Dream of the Red Chamber, Journey to the West, Romance of the Three Kingdoms, and biographies. From middle school onwards, he read Coconut House and practiced more writing.

When he started working, Kuan felt that his peers’ conversations were not deep enough, so he would write his views on internet blogs. Once, his article made it to the homepage of Tomorrow Times, which attracted the attention of Taiwanese netizens.

Career

Early career 
After graduating with a background in recording engineering in 1994, Kuan has been working in the pop music industry. He worked as a record engineer in the early stage of his career, and became a producer in 1997. The first album he produced was Juelong Zhang's "Zuopin 1997". After 2000, Kuan began to write songs. His work “Zuotian 昨天"  was chosen by Salsa Chen and became his first released song, published in Fish Leung's album “Courage 勇氣”. After he released another song “Kuai Le Shi Zi Zhao De 快樂是自找的" by Bibi Chao, he was invited by Francis Lee to write the song “Yuan Zui 原罪" for Karen Mok.

Kuan later joined the OP company FunkieMonkies founded by Eric Ng and Xiaohan. Since 2007, he has also been a writer in Warner Chappell Music.

Songwriter and producer 
Kuan's works include Michael Wong and Gary Chaw's “Shao Nian 少年”, Fish Leung's “Acceptance 接受”, Jolin Tsai's “Alone 一個人”, Tiger Huang's “Expecting Love 對愛期待”, Aska Yang's “Dui Ai Ke Wang 對愛渴望”, Jess Lee's “Separation 分隔線”, Show Luo's “Anonymous Sadness 不具名的悲傷", Eric Lin's “Nei Shang 內傷", Della's “Yi Ban 一半", Z Chen's “Ni Ai Shang De Wo 你愛上的我", etc. He has been actively promoting the works of Singapore and Malaysia artists, and have been participating in the production of a number of albums by singers at home and abroad. He also serves as the judge for talent competition TV shows from time to time.

In 2014, Kuan, agent Shuting Li and music producer Clement founded Dachafan Entertainment Agency 大茶飯娛樂經紀. In addition to training singers and artists, he also produces music for large-scale talent shows. He is also one of the music directors of The Voice SGMY.

Writer and film production 
In 2010, Kuan published the book “Wu Fen Zhong Wan Shi 五分鐘完事". His writings were also published in major press media in Malaysia, like in columns in Sin Chew Daily, China Press, and Nuyou Singapore.

In 2019, under the invitation of ASTRO TV, Kuan served as the screenplay of the film documenting 50 years of Malaysian Chinese music, "At the Equator". The film is currently the most complete documentary in the Malaysian Chinese music industry. Involving more than 100 local artists, musicians, and production crews, the film demonstrates the development and evolution of the Malaysian music industry over the past 50 years.

Kuan hopes that through this program, singers, musicians, and fans of different generations can review the legacies of the past and at the same time keep up with the new trends. This will allow both parties to understand each other's mindset and attitude about music. He hopes that the film can serve as the bridge between the two generations: "Some predecessors don’t make an effort to understand the young, whether what they do or what the influencers say. The previous generation should take a good look at what the younger generations is doing, instead of merely saying that they are all superficial. As for the new generation, they also need to be aware of the past, so they can appreciate what’s been cultivated and understand who started everything in the first place.”

In 2020, Kuan established “Xun Ren Qi Shi 尋人啟事" video production company, officially setting foot in the field of video production.

Artistry

Production mindset 
During his 7 or 8 years as an engineer, Kuan had heard numerous singers perform, and in turn cultivated his sensitivity to lyrics. He knows how to write words with impact, and at the same time considering the singer's capability to deliver. Sometimes the structure of the song is not easy to fill Chinese words in with limited rhymes. There are quite a few things to consider when it comes to lyrics writing.

When writing a song, most of the time that Kuan spent was on immersing himself into the song, while the actual writing process usually comes fast. If not disturbed, he is capable of delivering even under a tight deadline. Rainie Yang's “Qi Shi Wo Men Zhi De Xing Fu 其實我們值得幸福" was written just before the deadline while he sat in a cafe abroad.

Kuan likes to write narrative things, and he has written a lot of non-love songs. For example, Nicholas Teo's “Gei Peng You De Hua 給朋友的話" is written for friends who are sick, and Rainie Yang's “Qi Shi Wo Men Zhi De Xing Fu 其實我們值得幸福" is written for girls’ friendship.

Kuan's favorite lyrics include Jonathan Lee's “Shan Qiu 山丘", Wyman Wong's "Bitter Melon" written for Eason Chan, and "When the Grapes Are Mature". He has also made several attempts to write his own life into songs, and published similar works such as “Anonymous Sadness 不具名的悲傷", “Flyer 空中飛人", “Perhaps 如果”, etc.

Encouragement for new talents 
Kuan is optimistic about the prospects of the songwriters in the younger generation. He feels that the Internet generation is exposed to a lot of things; they do not have a specific pattern, are independent, and can deliver unexpected results that are interesting and unique. He encourages the new generation of songwriters not to worry about the songs being chosen or not, but rather they should live their lives to the fullest in order to write good songs that can touch people's hearts.

Works

Awards

References 

Living people
Year of birth missing (living people)